Barry Ward (born 13 January 1971 in New South Wales), is an Australian former professional rugby league footballer who played in the 1990s and 2000s.

He played over 100 first grade games during his long NRL career.

Playing career
In 1998, Ward was fined for racial vilification towards Anthony Mundine.

Ward played for St. Helens at prop forward in their 2002 Super League Grand Final victory against the Bradford Bulls. Having won Super League VI, St Helens contested the 2003 World Club Challenge against 2002 NRL Premiers, the Sydney Roosters. Ward played from the interchange bench in Saints' 38–0 loss.

Post playing
In 2008, Ward became a member of the Canterbury Bulldogs Football Club board. Ward relinquished membership of the board in late 2011 when he was named coach of the NSW Cup team.

References

External links
Saints Heritage Society profile
Canterbury Bulldogs profile

1971 births
Living people
Australian rugby league coaches
Australian rugby league players
Canterbury-Bankstown Bulldogs players
Illawarra Steelers players
New South Wales City Origin rugby league team players
Rugby league players from New South Wales
Rugby league props
Rugby league second-rows
St Helens R.F.C. players
Sydney Roosters players